Cileungsi is a district (Indonesian: kecamatan) in the Bogor Regency, West Java, Indonesia. It is a suburb located southeast of Jakarta, south of the city of Bekasi, east of Depok and is part of its metropolitan region, Jakarta Raya. The distance between Cileungsi and Jakarta is 37.7 km (23.4 miles).

Like much of the northern part of the Bogor Regency, the district is largely made up of huge industrial parks and areas, along with many warehouses and factories, making it a huge contribution to the district's industry.

Asides from industrial areas, Cileungsi is also populated with many commuters, and can be considered bedroom community. It features a lot of real estate housing, combined with another housing area to the west, called Cibubur. As a matter of fact, the housing area of Cibubur itself is beginning to extend to Cileungsi's boundaries, starting from the early-2000s.

The eastern portion of Cileungsi is home to a huge recreational park, featuring large gardens with tropical plants and plantations, as well as a waterpark, Taman Wisata Mekarsari.

References

External links
  Taman Wisata Mekar Sari
  Rumah Sakit MH Thamrin Cileungsi
 (Indonesia) tekno-cileungsi.blogspot.co.id

Districts of Bogor Regency